Heracles Kynagidas ("The Huntsman") was the patron god of hunting in the Macedonian Kingdom, to whom hunting trophies were dedicated. The epithet was also attributed to "Artemis Kynago" , in its female form.

Inscriptional attestations
Heracles Kynagidas is attested in fourteen inscriptions of various places in Macedonia from the 4th century BC to the 2nd century AD; Artemis Kynago, attested twice. The oldest inscription comes from Beroea (ca. 350-300 BC), where a sanctuary to Heracles Kynagidas has been discovered, as well the longest text including names of hunters and priests of the god. In a Roman-era inscription from Styberra, it is also spelled Kounagidas. A dedicatory inscription by King Philip V in Pella has also been found. Respectively, the Attic form for huntsman is kynêgetês, Doric kynagetas and Mycenaean ku-na-ke-ta-i.

Polybius
Polybius, who was interested in horse-riding and hunting, gives the following passage:

See also
Cynegeticus

References

Citations

Sources

Epithets of Heracles
Religion in ancient Macedonia
Hunting gods